McD v. L is a ruling by the Supreme Court of Ireland, handed down on 10 December 2009, that granted a sperm donor visitation rights to a child born via artificial insemination.  The case has been viewed as a victory by advocates for the rights of sperm donors and the men's rights movement.

Background

The donor, a gay man whose identity remains anonymous, had been friends with the lesbian couple to whom he donated sperm in 2006. However, the trio subsequently had a falling out and the women attempted to relocate to Australia. The donor obtained an injunction to prevent the mothers from leaving the country. He subsequently sought legal guardianship of the child.

See also
Men's rights
Sperm donation

Notes

External links
Text of McD v. L

2009 in Ireland
2009 in case law
Fathers' rights
Supreme Court of Ireland cases
LGBT rights case law
Reproductive rights case law